Gary Winterborne (born 26 June 1967) is a former English cricketer. Winterborne was a right-handed batsman who bowled right-arm medium. He was born at Hammersmith, London.

Winterborne made a single first-class appearance for Surrey against Cambridge University at Fenner's in 1986. He wasn't required to bat during the match, while with the ball he bowled a total of twenty wicketless overs, with the match ending in a draw. This was his only major appearance for Surrey.

References

External links
Gary Winterborne at ESPNcricinfo
Gary Winterborne at CricketArchive

1967 births
Living people
People from Hammersmith
English cricketers
Surrey cricketers